Adriana Lastra (born 30 March 1979 in Ribadesella) is a Spanish politician member of the Spanish Socialist Workers' Party who served as the Spokesperson of the Socialist Group in the Congress of Deputies. She was also the Deputy Secretary-General of the PSOE until 18 July 2022.

Biography
Lastra was born in Ribadesella, a municipality of the Spanish region of Asturias. She started the studies of cultural anthropology but she did not finish the career.

Lastra joined the Socialist Workers' Party at the age of 18 and she was appointed Secretary-General of the Socialist Youth of Asturias the following year, in 1999, being in the position until 2004 when she was appointed Secretary for Social Movements and NGOs. Between 2008 and 2012 she served as Secretary for Local Policy of the Asturian Socialist Federation.

In the 2007 Asturian regional election she was elected MP of the Parliament of Asturias and during that term she served as Spokesperson of the Socialist Group in the Committee for the Presidency, Justice and Equality. She was re-elected in the 2011 and 2012 regional elections.

National politics
As a very close person to the newly appointed Secretary-General of the PSOE, Pedro Sánchez, she served as Secretary for Local Policy of the Spanish Socialist Workers' Party.
Lastra participated for the first time in the national election in 2015, heading the list of the constituency of Asturias of the Socialist Party and she was elected MP of the Congress of Deputies. She was re-elected in the 2016 general election.

After the 2016 general election, the possibly of a third consecutive election was imminent and the Secretary-General Sánchez proposed to the Federal Committee of the PSOE (the executive body of the Party) the possibility of holding an Extraordinary Congress with an urgent nature to decide if they should allow the Second Rajoy Government or rejecting it (the position of Sánchez) by asking the voters. The position of most of the members of the Federal Committee was to refrain and allow Mariano Rajoy to form a new government, rejecting Sánchez's request and forcing his resignation. After his resignation, a Caretaker Commission take control of the Party and Lastra publicly rejected what the Federal Committee did.

She was one of the decisive supports in the decision of Pedro Sánchez to attend the 2017 leadership election to regain the leadership of the PSOE and played an essential role in the campaign of the candidate, based on the rejection of the ideological project of the People's Party and the importance of the socialist bases to recover the party. After Sánchez was  re-elected as Secretary-General with more than 50% of the votes, the 39th PSOE Congress was held in which Lastra was named Deputy Secretary-General becoming second-in-command to Sánchez and Deputy Spokesperson of the Socialist Group in the Congress of Deputies.

After the success of the 2018 vote of no confidence in the government of Mariano Rajoy, Pedro Sánchez was elected Prime Minister of Spain and the Leader (Spokesperson) of the Socialist Group in the Congress of Deputies Margarita Robles was appointed Minister of Defence, promoting Lastra to that position, becoming the youngest person and the third woman to occupy this position in the history of the Socialist Party. She was replaced by Héctor Gómez Hernández on 8 September 2021.

References

1979 births
Living people
People from Ribadesella
Members of the 11th Congress of Deputies (Spain)
Members of the 12th Congress of Deputies (Spain)
Members of the 13th Congress of Deputies (Spain)
Spanish Socialist Workers' Party politicians
Women members of the Congress of Deputies (Spain)
Members of the 14th Congress of Deputies (Spain)